Yeganeh Mahalleh (also Romanized as Yegāneh Maḩalleh) is a village in Asalem Rural District, Asalem District, Talesh County, Gilan Province, Iran. At the 2006 census, its population was 519, in 133 families. The local time zone is "Asia / Tehran" with an UTC offset of 4.5 hours.

References 

Populated places in Talesh County